The Louis and Beatrice Laufer Center for Physical and Quantitative Biology (Laufer Center) is a multidisciplinary venue where research from such fields as biology, biochemistry, chemistry, computer science, engineering, genetics, mathematics, and physics can come together and target medical and biological problems using both computation and experiment. The Laufer Center is part of Stony Brook University. The Center's founding and current director is Dr. Ken A. Dill. Other members are Associate Director Dr. Carlos Simmerling,and Henry Laufer Endowed Professor Gábor Balázsi and affiliated faculty from the Departments of Chemistry, Physics, Applied Mathematics, Pharmacology, Biomedical Engineering, Microbiology & Immunology, Ecology & Evolution and Computer Science at Stony Brook University, as well as from Brookhaven National Laboratory and Cold Spring Harbor Laboratory. Among the Laufer Center's goals is to enhance interdisciplinary education at Stony Brook University. Dr. Gábor Balázsi coordinates the flagship course of the Center, Physical and Quantitative Biology, which is offered each Fall through the Departments of Physics, Chemistry and Biomedical Engineering.

History

The center was founded in 2008 by a gift from Drs. Henry Laufer, Marsha Laufer and their family in memory of Louis and Beatrice Laufer. On May 7, 2012 the Laufer Center opened with a ribbon-cutting ceremony.

References

Bioinformatics organizations
Computational biology
Stony Brook University